Rudolf Somogyvári  (born Rezső Skoda 1916–1976) was a Hungarian actor. He was the voice of Mz / X in the hit Hungarian animated program The Mézga Family.

Selected filmography
 Viki (1937)
 Gázolás (1954)
 Professor Hannibal (1956)
 Three Nights of Love (1967)
 Stars of Eger (1968)
 Temperate Zone (1970)
 Csínom Palkó (1973)
 Pikemen (1975)

External links

1916 births
1976 deaths
Hungarian male film actors
Hungarian male voice actors
Hungarian male television actors
Male actors from Budapest
20th-century Hungarian male actors